SM U-10 was one of the 329 submarines serving in the Imperial German Navy in World War I.

Service history
U-10 was engaged in the naval warfare and took part in the First Battle of the Atlantic.

Fate
She sank on 30 June 1916, after probably striking a mine in the Gulf of Finland. All 29 crew were killed.

Summary of raiding history

References

Notes

Citations

Bibliography

External links

World War I submarines of Germany
Type U 9 submarines
U-boats commissioned in 1911
1911 ships
Ships built in Danzig
Maritime incidents in 1916
U-boats sunk in 1916
U-boats sunk by mines
World War I shipwrecks in the Baltic Sea